Plakophilin-1 is a protein that in humans is encoded by the PKP1 gene.

Function 

This gene encodes a member of the arm-repeat (armadillo) and plakophilin gene families. Plakophilin proteins contain numerous armadillo repeats, localize to cell desmosomes and nuclei, and participate in linking cadherins to intermediate filaments in the cytoskeleton. This protein may be involved in molecular recruitment and stabilization during desmosome formation. Mutations in this gene have been associated with the ectodermal dysplasia/skin fragility syndrome.

Interactions 

PKP1 has been shown to interact with Desmoplakin.

See also 
 Skin fragility syndrome

References

Further reading 

 
 
 
 
 
 
 
 
 
 
 
 
 
 
 
 
 
 

Armadillo-repeat-containing proteins